Super League X is the official name of 2005's Super League season. It was the 10th season of the Super League and saw twelve teams from across England compete for the premiership. The season kicked off in early February, culminating in a six team play-off series

The Grand Final, held at Old Trafford on 15 October, saw Bradford Bulls crowned Champions.

Season summary
Either one or two teams were to be relegated from the league at the end of the season in order to make way for new entrants. The bottom team were certain to be relegated, in order to allow in French club Catalans Dragons. The second bottom team would only be relegated if the winner of National League One met the criteria for Super League entry. On the 3 October the Rugby Football League announced that both finalists in this competition, Castleford Tigers and Whitehaven were eligible for promotion, hence two teams were relegated.

The season was a commercial success, with a rise in average crowd size for the regular rounds of 8,887, continuing the trend of rises every year since 2001. This is the first time in the history of Super League the Grand Final has not included the league leader at the end of the regular season: St Helens were knocked out by Bradford Bulls in the semi-final.

Table

Play-off

Grand final

15 October: Leeds Rhinos 6-15 Bradford Bulls

2005 Transfers

Players

References

External links
Super League X at wigan.rlfans.com